Office de Radiodiffusion et Télévision du Bénin (ORTB) is a mainstream terrestrial television channel and radio operator in Benin. It has its headquarters in Cotonou.

References

External links
Official site

Television in Benin
Mass media in Benin
Cotonou
Television channels and stations established in 1972